Reviving Toru Dutt is a short documentary on the Indian author Toru Dutt who lived in the 19th century. Dutt was the first Indian woman to visit France, to learn French there, and to write a novel in French. She translated works of 65 French poets to English.

Documentary 
Reviving Toru Dutt is hardly of fifteen minutes in length, directed by Deep Panjwani and Ravi Rajput for Foreshadow Pictures. The film relied much more on stills of the tomb of Toru Dutt and her letters which is produced by Dr Geeta Sheth who has done PhD on life of Dutt.

The script is written by academician Dr Gita Sheth, who has done her doctorate thesis on Dutt's contribution to French literature. Sheth feels that through this medium they are trying to bring her contribution before the public eye. "She never learnt French through formal education but gained expertise through self-learning. At a very young age, she wrote a novel in French which was published in France and the copy of the same is still available with National Library in Paris", said Sheth, who is the first French teacher in Gujarat.

The project was supported by city-based entrepreneur Vinod Agrawal. "After knowing about Dutt's life I felt she is an unsung literary hero. My film tries to capture her 21 year life in 15 minutes. But one needs to make a 60-minute film to share Dutt's achievements," said Panjwani to Times of India.

After getting the entire script from Sheth, the challenging part was to portray Dutt's life without incurring any expenditure. "We used local heritage buildings and actors for shooting the film. The final outcome has been more than satisfactory," Panjwani added.

Reception 
The documentary got generally good response in international film festivals. It was first premiered at Francophone film festival at Delhi in the French Embassy followed by screening at Mumbai French Embassy where it got rave reviews from critics. The film made it to the list of 35 films that are official entries in the short films competitive category in AIFF.

References 

Indian short films